Syllepte penthodes is a moth in the family Crambidae. It was described by Edward Meyrick in 1902. It is found on the Maldives in the Indian Ocean.

References

Moths described in 1902
penthodes
Moths of Asia